1995 Sanfrecce Hiroshima season

Review and events

League results summary

League results by round

Competitions

Domestic results

J.League

Emperor's Cup

Player statistics

 † player(s) joined the team after the opening of this season.

Transfers

In:

Out:

Transfers during the season

In
 Toshikazu Katō (from Sanfrecce Hiroshima satellite team GK coach)
 John van Loen (from Feyenoord on March)
 Tsukimitsu Mizuta (from Kunimi High School)
 Susumu Ōki (from Aoyama Gakuin University)
 Masayuki Ōmori

Out
 Tore Pedersen (on March)
 Andrey (on November)
 Tomohiro Katanosaka (to Kashiwa Reysol)

Awards
none

References

Other pages
 J. League official site
 Sanfrecce Hiroshima official site

Sanfrecce Hiroshima
Sanfrecce Hiroshima seasons